The National Art Museum of China (NAMOC) is located at 1 Wusi Ave, Dongcheng District, Beijing, People's Republic of China. It is one of the largest art museums in China, and is funded by the Ministry of Culture. The construction of the museum started in 1958, and concluded in 1962.

Collection

Its permanent collection includes both ancient and contemporary Chinese artworks as well as notable Western artworks. Although the museum contains collection of imperial Chinese art, its main mission is to serve as a national level art museum dedicated to displaying, collecting and researching the modern and contemporary artistic works of China. It has a main building of four stories, the first three being display areas. There are 21 exhibition halls at the museum.

Its collections are divided into specific categories of: 
traditional Chinese painting,
oil painting,
print,
sculpture,
Chinese New Year picture,
traditional picture story,
caricature,
watercolor painting,
lacquer, 
porcelain, and
costumes

Expansion
In 2012, four high-profile architects — Frank Gehry, Zaha Hadid, Jean Nouvel and Moshe Safdie — were invited to submit designs for the new National Art Museum venue, which will be seven times larger than the current venue. The museum will be built in collaboration with the Beijing Institute of Architectural Design. Nouvel's plans were revealed on September 18, 2014 at a press conference in Paris attended by the architect and Chinese and French politicians including Laurent Fabius, the French minister of foreign affairs and international development.

Gallery

See also 
 List of museums in China

References

External links

 Official website of NAMOC

Museums in Beijing
Art museums and galleries in China
Asian art museums in China
Art museums established in 1958
Art galleries established in 1962
Dongcheng District, Beijing
1958 establishments in China